Grant Ritchie may refer to:

 Grant Ritchie (actor)
 Grant, Ritchie and Company, a Scottish engineering company